Elections to the United Andhra Pradesh Legislative Assembly were held on 25 February 1957. 319 candidates contested for the 85 constituencies in the Assembly. There were 20 two-member constituencies and 65 single-member constituencies. The members of the first assembly (1955–62) who were elected from the 1955 election were allowed a seven-year term. That is to say in 1957, elections were conducted in the newly added region of Telangana alone and then in 1962 general elections were held for the state as a whole.

State reorganization
On 1 November 1956, Andhra State was merged with Hyderabad State under States Reorganisation Act, 1956, to form a single state, Andhra Pradesh. The districts of Raichur, Gulbarga, and the Marathwada district were detached from the Hyderabad State while merging with Andhra State. Also, the Siruguppa taluk, the Bellary taluk, the Hospet taluk, and a small area of the Mallapuram sub-taluk were transferred from Mysore State to Andhra Pradesh. The districts of Raichur and Gulbarga were transferred to the Mysore State, while the Marathwada district was transferred to the Bombay State.

Results

Elected members

See also

 1957 elections in India
 1955 Andhra Pradesh Legislative Assembly election
 1952 Hyderabad Legislative Assembly election

References

1957
1957
Andhra Pradesh